Eukaryotic elongation factor 2 is a protein that in humans is encoded by the EEF2 gene. It is the archaeal and eukaryotic counterpart of bacterial EF-G.

This gene encodes a member of the GTP-binding translation elongation factor family. This protein is an essential factor for protein synthesis. It promotes the GTP-dependent translocation of the ribosome. This protein is completely inactivated by EF-2 kinase phosphorylation.

aEF2/eEF2 found in most archaea and eukaryotes, including humans, contains a post translationally modified histidine diphthamide. It is the target of diphtheria toxin (from Corynebacterium diphtheriae), and exotoxin A (from Pseudomonas aeruginosa). The inactivation of EF-2 by toxins inhibits protein production in the host, causing symptoms due to loss of function in affected cells.

References

Further reading

External links